Hannah Mayho (born 10 December 1990) is an English road and track cyclist from Cullingworth, West Yorkshire, and a member of British Cycling's Olympic Academy Squad. A former county netball player and cross-country runner, Mayho began cycling in 2006 having been spotted at her school by British Cycling's Talent Team, she was then coached by their coaches Phil West and Frances Newstead. At first she concentrated on athletics, but, seeing the pathway to success more clearly defined in cycling, she chose to concentrate on that sport.

A car collided with her on a training ride in May 2010, breaking her left leg and her right arm and wrist. A year after her accident Mayho returned to racing at the British National Time Trial Championships where she finished third in the Junior Women's event.

Mayho went on to study for a BSc in Nutrition and Dietetics at the University of Chester.

Palmarès

2006
1st  British National Circuit Race Championships (U16)
1st  Pursuit, British National Track Championships (U16)
3rd Pursuit, British National Track Championships (Junior)

2007
2nd Pursuit, 2007 European Track Championships (Junior)
1st  Pursuit, British National Track Championships (Junior)
1st  British National Road Race Championships (Junior)
2nd Scratch race, British National Track Championships (Junior)
3rd 500m TT, British National Track Championships (Junior)

2008
1st  Pursuit, 2008 European Track Championships (Junior)
1st  Team pursuit, 2008 European Track Championships (Junior)
3rd  British National Road Race Championships (Junior)
1st  Pursuit, British National Track Championships (Junior)
3rd 500m TT, British National Track Championships (Junior)

2009
2nd  Pursuit, 2009 UEC European Cup, Barcelona (Senior)
2nd  Pursuit, British National Track Championships (Senior)
2nd  Scratch Race, British National Track Championships (Senior)
2nd  Points Race, British National Track Championships (Senior)

2011
3rd  10-mile Time Trial, British National Time Trial Championships (Junior)

References

External links

1990 births
Living people
English track cyclists
English female cyclists
Sportspeople from Bradford
Cyclists from Yorkshire